Drive Lake is a lake in the Nelson River drainage basin in the Unorganized Part of Kenora District in northwestern Ontario, Canada. Drive Lake is the source of Drive Creek; the creek leaves the lake at its eastern tip and flows into the Marchington River.

See also
List of lakes in Ontario

References

Lakes of Kenora District